The Men's road race H3 cycling event at the 2012 Summer Paralympics took place on September 7 at Brands Hatch. Ten riders from eight nations competed. The race distance was 64 km.

Results
LAP=Lapped (8 km). DNF=Did Not Finish.

References

Men's road race H3